is a 1991 3D driving simulation arcade game developed and published in Japan by Namco. The game has a pseudo-panoramic view using three CRT screens; the player would sit in a then-realistic Formula One car cockpit with LCD instruments. The game would start with the player selecting either "easy drive" or "technical drive". Once the selection was made the screen would show a 3D model of a Formula One car with a V8 engine being placed into the engine bay and then the body work gliding down. As that happened the camera view would change and reveal a sign saying "BRAKES ON". When the sign lifted the race would start.

Reception 
In Japan, Game Machine listed Driver's Eyes on their May 1, 1991 issue as being the second most-successful upright/cockpit arcade game of the month.

Notes

References

External links

1991 video games
Arcade video games
Arcade-only video games
Formula One video games
Namco games
Namco arcade games
Racing simulators
Video games developed in Japan
Single-player video games